Sibynophis geminatus, commonly known as Boie's many-toothed snake, is a species of nonvenomous colubrid snake found in Thailand,
Malaysia, Indonesia, and the Philippines.

References

Sibynophis
Reptiles of Thailand
Reptiles of Malaysia
Reptiles of Indonesia
Reptiles of the Philippines
Reptiles described in 1826
Taxa named by Heinrich Boie
Reptiles of Borneo